Man Descending is a collection of short stories written by Saskatchewan-born writer Guy Vanderhaeghe. The book was first published by Macmillan of Canada in 1982 and Vanderhaeghe went on to become one of the few first-time authors to win the coveted Governor General's Award for Fiction for this work. It also won the Geoffrey Faber Memorial Prize.

The book consists of 12 stories covering different ages in people's lives, ranging from teenage romance to the onset of Alzheimer's disease. Among the more often-quoted stories in this work are "Sam, Soren and Ed" which introduced characters Vanderhaeghe would later feature in his first novel, My Present Age, and "The Expatriates' Party" in which a high school teacher launches a profanity-laced tirade against a troublesome student.

Several stories in this collection were previously published in Canadian literary journals, magazines, and compilations. One story, "Reunion", was later reprinted in an edition of Best American Short Stories, even though its author was Canadian.

A short film by Raymond Lorenz and Neil Grieve, based upon the story "Man Descending", was nominated for the Genie Award for Best Theatrical Short Film at the 12th Genie Awards. Canadian singer-songwriter Justin Rutledge's 2008 album Man Descending was also named for the book.

Story list

 The Watcher
 Reunion
 How the Story Ends
 What I Learned from Caesar
 Drummer
 Cages
 Going to Russia
 A Taste for Perfection
 The Expatriates' Party
 Dancing Bear
 Man Descending
 Sam, Soren and Ed

References

1982 short story collections
Short story collections by Guy Vanderhaeghe
New Canadian Library
Governor General's Award-winning fiction books
Macmillan Publishers books